Zero field splitting (ZFS) describes various interactions of the energy levels of a molecule or ion resulting from the presence of more than one unpaired electron. In quantum mechanics, an energy level is called degenerate if it corresponds to two or more different measurable states of a quantum system. In the presence of a magnetic field, the Zeeman effect is well known to split degenerate states. In quantum mechanics terminology, the degeneracy is said to be "lifted" by the presence of the magnetic field. In the presence of more than one unpaired electron, the electrons mutually interact to give rise to two or more energy states. Zero field splitting refers to this lifting of degeneracy even in the absence of a magnetic field.  ZFS is responsible for many effects related to the magnetic properties of materials, as manifested in their electron spin resonance spectra and magnetism.

The classic case for ZFS is the spin triplet, i.e., the S=1 spin system.  In the presence of a magnetic field, the levels with different values of magnetic spin quantum number (MS=0,±1) are separated and the Zeeman splitting dictates their separation.  In the absence of magnetic field, the 3 levels of the triplet are isoenergetic to the first order. However, when the effects of inter-electron repulsions are considered, the energy of the three sublevels of the triplet can be seen to have separated.  This effect is thus an example of ZFS. The degree of separation depends on the symmetry of the system.

Quantum mechanical description
The corresponding Hamiltonian can be written as:

The value of the ZFS parameter are usually defined via D and E parameters.  D describes the axial component of the magnetic dipole–dipole interaction, and E the transversal component. Values of D have been obtained for a wide number of organic biradicals by EPR measurements. This value may be measured by other magnetometry techniques such as SQUID; however, EPR measurements provide more accurate data in most cases. This value can also be obtained with other techniques such as optically detected magnetic resonance (ODMR; a double resonance technique which combines EPR with measurements such as fluorescence, phosphorescence and absorption), with sensitivity down to a single molecule or defect in solids like diamond (e.g. N-V center) or silicon carbide.

Algebraic derivation
The start is the corresponding Hamiltonian .  describes the dipolar spin-spin interaction between two unpaired spins ( and ). Where  is the total spin , and  being a symmetric and traceless (which it is when  arises from dipole-dipole interaction) matrix, which means it is diagonalizable.

with  being traceless. The Hamiltonian becomes:

The key is to express  as its mean value and a deviation 

To find the value for the deviation  which is then by rearranging equation:

By inserting and  into the result reads as:

Note, that in the second line in 
 was added. By doing so  can be further used.
By using the fact, that  is traceless equation simplifies to:

By defining D and E parameters equation becomes to:

References

Further reading
 Principles of electron spin resonance: By N M Atherton. pp 585. Ellis Horwood PTR Prentice Hall. 1993

External links
Description of the origins of Zero Field Splitting

Electron paramagnetic resonance